David Rotenberg (July 24, 1930 - January 13, 2022) is a former politician in Ontario, Canada. He served in the Legislative Assembly of Ontario from 1977 to 1985 as a member of the Progressive Conservative Party, and was briefly a cabinet minister in the government of Frank Miller.

Background
Rotenberg was born in Toronto, and educated at the University of Toronto.  He worked as an insurance agent, and served on Toronto City Council and Metro Toronto Council. He was first elected in the 1960 Toronto municipal election and re-elected in 1962, 1964, 1966, and 1969.

In the 1972 election, he ran for mayor, and lost to David Crombie in a close, three-way race. Rotenberg was later appointed as a commissioner on the Toronto Transit Commission, and served from 1975 to 1977.

Politics
He ran in the 1975 provincial election, and finished second against Liberal Vern Singer in Wilson Heights.

He was elected to the Ontario legislature in the 1977 provincial election, defeating New Democratic Party candidate Howard Moscoe by 2,993 votes (Singer had previously announced his retirement).  He served as a backbench supporter of William Davis's government, and defeated Liberal Elinor Caplan to be re-elected in 1981.

Rotenberg supported Dennis Timbrell to succeed Davis as party leader and premier in 1985, and endorsed Larry Grossman after Timbrell's elimination on the second ballot.  Rotenberg appears in a pictorial section between pages 106 and 107, standing between Grossman and Timbrell as the latter accepts a Grossman button. The caption beneath the picture identifies Rotenberg as a Timbrell supporter.
  Grossman lost to Frank Miller on the final count. After the leadership convention, Miller appointed Rotenberg to cabinet as a minister without portfolio responsible for Urban Affairs.

Near the end of his tenure as premier, Bill Davis announced that he would extend full funding to the province's Catholic school system.  Anglican Archbishop Lewis Garnsworthy, a vocal opponent of the plan, responded by charging that Davis had changed Ontario's education system "by decree", in the same way that Adolf Hitler had changed the education system in Nazi Germany. Rotenberg later said that Garnsworthy's comments created a climate of religious intolerance in the province, and took support away from the Progressive Conservative Party.  "I think he would probably get the Ian Paisley award of the year, because his speech made it respectable to be anti-Catholic," Rotenberg was quoted as saying. Although the opposition Liberals and New Democratic Party also supported full funding for Catholic schools, the governing Conservatives were more seriously affected because some of their religious supporters abstained from voting, depriving them of significant support. Garnsworthy's speech was credited with prolonging the controversy during the 1985 campaign.

Rotenberg was unseated in 1985 campaign, losing to Liberal candidate Monte Kwinter by 2,188 votes.  The Progressive Conservatives were reduced to a minority government and it was brought down by a Liberal-NDP accord shortly after the election.

A decade later, Rotenberg attempted a return to politics and campaigned for the House of Commons of Canada in the 1997 federal election as a candidate of the Progressive Conservatives in the riding of Eglinton—Lawrence. He lost to incumbent Liberal Joe Volpe.  The Canadian Alliance tried to recruit Rotenberg as a candidate in Willowdale for the 2000 federal election, but he was disqualified because he had not been a party member for long enough.

Later life
Rotenberg has been named as an honorary officer in the Canadian Jewish Congress.

Electoral record

Provincial

Federal

References

External links
 

1930 births
Jewish Canadian politicians
Living people
Progressive Conservative Party of Ontario MPPs
Toronto city councillors
Members of the Executive Council of Ontario
Progressive Conservative Party of Canada candidates for the Canadian House of Commons
Candidates in the 1997 Canadian federal election